Dendrobium capra is a species of orchid endemic to the New Caledonia, Santa Cruz Islands, Vanuatu and Wallis & Futna.

References

macranthum
Plants described in 1834